Lago di Telese is a lake in the Province of Benevento, Campania, Italy. Its surface area is 0.049 km2.

References

Lakes of Campania